The Crown Conference is a high school athletic conference for Catholic schools in Greater Cleveland, Ohio.  The conference began play in the 2021–22 school year.

Members

Former member

History 
The Crown Conference was established on September 21, 2020, by six Cleveland-area high schools: Beaumont, Lake Catholic, Notre Dame-Cathedral Latin (NDCL), Padua Franciscan, Villa Angela-St. Joseph (VASJ), and Walsh Jesuit.  All six schools were members of the former North Coast League, which disbanded earlier in 2020.  The league began play in all sports in the 2021-22 school year.  As Beaumont is an all-girls school, the conference fields five members in boys sports and six in girls' sports.

The conference took its name from the former Crown Conference, which was an all-Catholic school league in greater Cleveland that existed from 1967 to 1980.  Lake Catholic, NDCL (as Cathedral Latin), Padua, and VASJ (as St. Joseph) were members of the original Crown Conference along with Holy Name, St. Edward, and St. Peter Chanel.

In 2022, VASJ was expelled from the conference after one season.

References 

Ohio high school sports conferences
Sports in Greater Cleveland